The year 2013 was the 4th year in the history of the Road Fighting Championship, an MMA promotion based in South Korea. 2013 started with Road FC 011 and ended with Road FC 013.

List of events

Road FC 013 

 Road FC 013 was an MMA event held by the Road FC on October 12, 2013 at the Gumi Indoor Gymnasium in Gumi, South Korea.

Results

Road FC 012 

 Road FC 012 was an MMA event held by the Road FC on June 22, 2013 at the Wonju Chiak Gymnasium in Wonju, Gangwon, South Korea.

Results

Tournament Pair Assignment for selecting the second Champion in Road FC Bantamweight Division

Road FC 011 

 Road FC 011 was an MMA event held by the Road FC on April 13, 2013 at the OlympicHall, OlympicPark in Seoul, South Korea.

Results

Tournament Pair Assignment for selecting the first Champion in Road FC  Lightweight Division 

1. Participating as a substitute because of the injury of Yong Jae Lee
2. Extended round

See also
 List of Road FC events
 List of Road FC champions
 List of current Road FC fighters
 List of current mixed martial arts champions

References 

Road Fighting Championship events
2013 in mixed martial arts
2013 in South Korean sport
2013 in Asian sport